Bernet is a surname. Notable people with the surname include:

 Agnès Bernet (born 1968), is a French cell biologist
 David Bernet, Swiss movie-director
 Ed Bernet (born 1933), American football player
John Joseph Bernet (1868–1935), American railroad executive
 Jordi Bernet (born 1944), Spanish comics artist
 Lee Bernet (born 1944), American football player

See also
BERNET, the Bangladesh Education and Research Network